Naken, blästrad och skitsur is the first album by the Swedish hardcore band LOK.

Track listing
 "Lokpest" (Lok Plague) – 2:13
 "Skrubbsår" (Grazes) – 2:45
 "Låt 3ton" (Song Thirteen/Let Three Tons)- 4:21
 "LOK står när de andra faller" (LOK Stands While Others Fall)– 2:24
 "Passa dig" (Watch It) – 1:32
 "Barnbok" (Children's Book)– 5:11
 "Ensam gud" (Lone God) – 2:25
 "Experiment" – 3:18
 "Hem till gården" (Back Home at the farm) – 3:42
 "Tommys ponny (bröderna Cartwright)" (Tommy's Pony [The Brothers Cartwright])– 2:39
 "Som en hund" (Like a Dog)– 3:53
 "Natten till i morgon" (All Night Long)– 6:03

Credits
 Martin Westerstrand – Vocals
 Thomas Brandt – Guitar
 Daniel Cordero – Bass
 Johan Reivén – Drums

1999 albums
LOK (band) albums